Poglu (more commonly rendered in English as Paglu, in ), is an Odia feature film released in 2018. It was produced by Jagannath Patajoshi Mohapatra, and directed by Rama Prashad Samal.

Lead roles were acted by Prakruti Mishra and Abhisek Behura. Mihir Das, Aparajita Mohanty, Daitari Panda, and Papu Pom Pom acted in supporting roles.

Cast 

 Prakruti Mishra
 Abhisek Behura as Paglu
 Mihir Das
 Aparajita Mohanty
 Daitari Panda
 Papu Pom Pom

Story

Songs & Music 
Music given by Abhijit Majumdar.

Songs

References

External links 

 

2018 films